Defence was launched in 1803 at South Shields. She spent much of her career as a London-based transport. In the 1820s she sailed between Scotland and North America, particularly to Canada. She was wrecked in March 1832.

Career
Defence first appeared in the Register of Shipping (RS) in 1804 with Trotter, master, S. Temple, owner, and trade London coaster.

Fate
Defense  was sailing from Alloa to Quebec when she was totally wrecked on 31 March 1832 near the entrance of Longhope, Orkney. Her crew was saved. On 10 April 1832 Lloyd's List too reported that Defence, Kinnear, master, had been totally wrecked near .

Citations

References
 

1803 ships
Ships built by Temple shipbuilders
Age of Sail merchant ships of England
Maritime incidents in March 1832